Bernard Brochand (born 5 June 1938 in Nice) is a French politician who was a member of the National Assembly of France from 2001 to 2002. He represented the 8th constituency of the Alpes-Maritimes department, as a member of the Republicans. His constituency covered the Riviera resort of Cannes.

Professional life 

His career began at Procter & Gamble, before rising to be the head of Eurocom in 1975, and DDB International publicity agency in 1989.

His lifelong passion for sport, and especially football lead to his joining the administration council of Paris Saint-Germain F.C. in 1971, and becoming the president of the club association at the end of the 1990s.

Political life 

He is a member of The Republicans (LR) group in the National Assembly. In 2004, he co-signed a proposition to re-establish the death penalty for acts of terrorism.

At 79, he became the Father of the House at the 2017 parliamentary election.

He is not seeking re-election in the 2022 French legislative election.

References 

1938 births
Living people
People from Nice
Rally for the Republic politicians
Union for a Popular Movement politicians
The Republicans (France) politicians
The Strong Right
The Social Right
Modern and Humanist France
Deputies of the 15th National Assembly of the French Fifth Republic
Mayors of places in Provence-Alpes-Côte d'Azur
HEC Paris alumni
Deputies of the 11th National Assembly of the French Fifth Republic
Deputies of the 12th National Assembly of the French Fifth Republic
Deputies of the 13th National Assembly of the French Fifth Republic
Deputies of the 14th National Assembly of the French Fifth Republic

21st-century French politicians